Brejetuba is a municipality located in the Brazilian state of Espírito Santo. Its population was 12,427 (2020) and its area is 354 km2.

References

Municipalities in Espírito Santo